Scott Seligman (born 1951) is an American real estate developer, the founder of the Sterling Bank and Trust FSB, and minority owner of the San Francisco Giants major league baseball team.

Biography
Seligman was born to a Jewish family in Detroit, Michigan, the son of Irving R. Seligman. His father founded Seligman & Associates, Inc. in 1954 which initially focused on building garages in Detroit but soon expanded into building single family homes in Detroit and Las Vegas. He attended the Detroit Country Day School and  graduated with a B.A. from University of Michigan. In 1971, Seligman & Associates went public and in 1973, Seligman joined his father's company as Vice President of Seligman of Florida, Inc. In 1976, he became Vice-President of Seligman & Associates, responsible for building single-family homes and managing owned multi-family properties; and in 1977, he became President, Director, and CEO of Seligman & Associates. By 1985, Seligman had developed over 10,000 units. In 1984, he founded the Sterling Savings and Loan Association which focused on residential mortgage lending and servicing. In 1987, the Seligman family took Seligman private. In 1990, Sterling expanded into commercial real estate lending. In 1993, Sterling Savings and Loan was renamed Sterling Bank and Trust, FSB. In 1995, the bank had $78 million in assets; by 2015, Sterling had grown to $1.3 billion in assets with 18 branches in the San Francisco area and its headquarters in Southfield, Michigan. In 2015, it pioneered the use of robotic greeters. In 1999, Seligman retired from Sterling to focus on real estate activities reallocating the bulk of the firms' portfolio to California by selling most of its Detroit area assets.

He is a minority owner of the San Francisco Giants major league baseball team via his membership in an ownership group (San Francisco Baseball Associates LLC) led by Charles Bartlett Johnson (which also includes Peter Magowan, Philip Halperin, Allan Byer, David S. Wolff, and Larry Baer), that purchased the team from Bob Lurie in 1992.

Philanthropy 
Seligman is active in Jewish causes. Seligman served on the Capital Planning Committee at the Jewish Community Federation of San Francisco, was a board member of the Jewish Federation of Las Vegas, served on the board of the Jewish Telegraphic Agency, and served as a Committee Member with Birthright Israel.
 He donated to and named the new Santa Fe Jewish Center-Chabad in historic Santa Fe

References 

1951 births
American bank presidents
American real estate businesspeople
San Francisco Giants owners
Detroit Country Day School alumni
University of Michigan alumni
Jewish American baseball people
Living people
21st-century American Jews